<div style="float: right; font-size: smaller; background-color:#E6E6FA; padding: 12px; margin-left: 5em; margin-bottom: 2em; width: 180px" align="center">
15th StLFCA Awards
December 16, 2018

Best Film: A Star Is Born

Best Director: Spike LeeBlacKkKlansman

</div>
The nominees for the 15th St. Louis Film Critics Association Awards were announced on December 10, 2018. The winners were announced on December 16, 2018.

Winners and nominees

Best Film

 A Star Is Born
BlacKkKlansman
 First Reformed
 Roma
 Vice

Best Actor
 Ethan Hawke - First Reformed
 Christian Bale - Vice
 Bradley Cooper - A Star Is Born
 Willem Dafoe - At Eternity's Gate
 Rami Malek - Bohemian Rhapsody

Best Supporting Actor
 Richard E. Grant - Can You Ever Forgive Me?
 Mahershala Ali - Green Book
 Steve Carell - Vice
 Timothée Chalamet - Beautiful Boy
 Michael B. Jordan - Black Panther

Best Original Screenplay
 Vice - Adam McKay Eighth Grade - Bo Burnham
 The Favourite - Deborah Davis and Tony McNamara
 First Reformed - Paul Schrader
 A Quiet Place - Scott Beck & Bryan Woods and John Krasinski

Best Cinematography
 Roma - Alfonso Cuarón The Favourite - Robbie Ryan
 First Man - Linus Sandgren
 Green Book - Sean Porter
 If Beale Street Could Talk - James Laxton
 A Star Is Born - Matthew Libatique

Best Editing
 Vice - Hank Corwin First Man - Tom Cross
 Roma - Alfonso Cuarón and Adam Gough
 A Star Is Born - Jay Cassidy
 Widows - Joe Walker

Best Production Design
 Black Panther - Hannah Beachler The Favourite - Fiona Crombie
 First Man - Nathan Crowley
 If Beale Street Could Talk - Mark Friedberg
 Roma - Eugenio Caballero

Best Foreign Language Film
 Roma
 Capernaum
 The Captain
 The Guilty
 Shoplifters

Best Animated Feature
 Spider-Man: Into the Spider-Verse
 Hotel Transylvania 3: Summer Vacation
 Incredibles 2
 Isle of Dogs
 Ralph Breaks the Internet
 Early Man

Best Action Film
 Mission: Impossible – Fallout
 Ant-Man and the Wasp
 Avengers: Infinity War
 Black Panther
 Ready Player One
 Skyscraper

Best Director
 Spike Lee - BlacKkKlansman Bradley Cooper - A Star Is Born
 Alfonso Cuarón - Roma
 Yorgos Lanthimos - The Favourite
 Adam McKay - Vice

Best Actress
 Toni Collette - Hereditary Glenn Close - The Wife Olivia Colman - The Favourite Lady Gaga - A Star Is Born Charlize Theron - TullyBest Supporting Actress
 Regina King - If Beale Street Could Talk
 Amy Adams - Vice Emily Blunt - A Quiet Place Emma Stone - The Favourite Rachel Weisz - The FavouriteBest Adapted Screenplay
 BlacKkKlansman  - Charlie Wachtel & David Rabinowitz and Kevin Willmott & Spike Lee (Screenplay); Ron Stallworth (Book) Can You Ever Forgive Me? - Nicole Holofcener and Jeff Whitty (Screenplay); Lee Israel (Novel)
 If Beale Street Could Talk  - Barry Jenkins (Screenplay); James Baldwin (Novel)
 A Star Is Born - Eric Roth and Bradley Cooper & Will Fetters (Screenplay); Moss Hart (1954 Screenplay); John Gregory Dunne, Joan Didion, and Frank Pierson (1976 Screenplay); William A. Wellman and Robert Carson (Story)
 Widows - Gillian Flynn and Steve McQueen (Screenplay); Lynda La Plante (Teleplay)

Best Visual Effects
 Avengers: Infinity War Annihilation Black Panther Ready Player One Solo: A Star Wars StoryBest Music Score
 BlacKkKlansman - Terence Blanchard Annihilation - Geoff Barrow and Ben Salisbury
 The Ballad of Buster Scruggs - Carter Burwell
 First Man - Justin Hurwitz
 If Beale Street Could Talk - Nicholas Britell

Best Soundtrack
 Bohemian Rhapsody BlacKkKlansman The Hate U Give Ready Player One A Star Is BornBest Documentary Feature
 Won't You Be My Neighbor? Free Solo RBG Science Fair Three Identical StrangersBest Comedy Film
 The Favourite Deadpool 2 Game Night Paddington 2 Sorry to Bother YouBest Scene
 'Roma - Beach rescue. Avengers: Infinity War - Thor arrives in Wakanda.
 BlacKkKlansman - Final montage. Bohemian Rhapsody - Live Aid.
 Vice - Ending.

Multiple nominations and awards

These films had multiple nominations:
 8 nominations:  The Favourite, A Star Is Born, Vice
 7 nominations:  Roma
 6 nominations:  BlacKkKlansman
 5 nominations:  If Beale Street Could Talk
 4 nominations:  Black Panther, First Man
 3 nominations:  Avengers: Infinity War, Bohemian Rhapsody, First Reformed, Ready Player One
 2 nominations:  Annihilation, Can You Ever Forgive Me?, Green Book, A Quiet Place, Widows

These films had multiple wins:
 3 wins:  BlacKkKlansman, Roma
 2 wins:  Vice

References

External links
 Official website

2018
2018 film awards
2018 in Missouri
St Louis